Perreyiinae is a subfamily of sawflies in the family Pergidae. There are about 16 genera and more than 90 described species in Perreyiinae.

Genera
These 16 genera belong to the subfamily Perreyiinae:

 Ancyloneura Cameron, 1877
 Barilochia Malaise, 1955
 Camptoprium Spinola, 1840
 Cladomacra Smith, 1860
  Clarissa Kirby, 1894
 Dalia Schmidt & Brown, 2005
 Decameria Lepeletier de Saint Fargeau & Audinet-Serville, 1828
 Diphamorphos Rohwer, 1910
 Eurys Newman, 1841
 Heteroperreyia Schrottky, 1915
 Neoeurys Rohwer, 1910
 Perreyia Brullé, 1846
 Perreyiella Conde, 1937
 Polyclonus Kirby, 1882
 Warra Benson, 1934
 † Fonsecadalia Mendes et al., 2015

References

Tenthredinoidea